Francis Thomas Verity (1864–1937) was an English cinema architect during the cinema building boom of the years following World War I.

Early life
Verity was born in London, educated at Cranleigh and joined Thomas Verity, his father, in his architectural practice, which specialised in theatre  building.

Career
Both Veritys brought an interest in ornate Second Empire-style architecture to their early buildings, developing this into grand Beaux Arts in their later works. Many of the surviving buildings have achieved recognition in the late 20th century, becoming listed for their architectural significance.

Frank Verity continued the practice on his father's death, and Sam Beverley, his son-in-law, joined the practice in the 1920s, which remains active today. The company designed over 25 cinemas, achieving a Royal Institute of British Architects bronze medal for the Shepherd's Bush Pavilion cinema in 1930.

In 1915 he was the architect of a block of flats on the site of the former Somerset House on Park Lane, the first such building in that important street.

Verity designed many central London premises, including: the Carlton Theatre (1927), now a cinema; the Embassy Theatre (1923) and restaurant in High Holborn, now demolished and the site occupied by offices; and the Plaza Theatre (1926) as a cinema for Paramount - remains in use.

References

Further reading
Theatre London: An Architectural Guide, Edwin Heathcote, 
Guide to British Theatres 1750-1950, Earl, John and Michael Sell pp. 283–284 (Theatres Trust, 2000)

External links
Verity & Beverley  Architects • Designers

1864 births
1937 deaths
English theatre architects